The Accreditation Commission on Colleges of Medicine (ACCM) is an international medical review and accreditation agency service for medical schools.

The National Committee on Foreign Medical Education and Accreditation (NCFMEA),   part of the United States Department of Education,  has listed ACCM as  "found to use standards to accredit their medical schools that are comparable to the standards used to accredit medical schools in the United States."

In 2017 ACCM was granted a 10-year recognition by the World Federation on Medical Education (WFME)

The ACCM works on behalf of the governments in relation to medical school standards in the following Caribbean countries and one middle Eastern country and according to its site there is only one ACCM accredited medical school in each of the countries:.

As of 2020, various schools (Aureus University School of Medicine in Aruba, Arabian Gulf University (AGU) in Bahrain and Jordan University of Science & Technology in Jordan) were pending onsite full accreditation inspection which would be scheduled after travel restrictions associated with the COVID-19 global pandemic were removed.

See also
 List of medical schools in the Caribbean
 Caribbean Accreditation Authority for Education in Medicine and other Health Professions

References

External links
 Website

School accreditors
Medical education